The sublingual vein is a vein which drains the tongue.

Veins of the head and neck